Lester Beall (1903 – 1969) was an American graphic designer who was a leading proponent of modernist graphic design in the United States.

Biography 
Lester Thomas Beall was born in Kansas City, Missouri. His family moved to St. Louis, Missouri, and later to Chicago, Illinois. Beall earned a degree in art history from the University of Chicago  and was active on the varsity track team coached by Amos Alonzo Stagg. Beall also took classes at the Art Institute of Chicago. After a short period of experimentation and professional work in Chicago, Beall moved to New York in 1935. The following year he established his home/office in Wilton, Connecticut. 

According to his online AIGA biography  by R. Roger Remington: "Through the 1930s and 1940s Beall produced innovative and highly regarded work for clients including the Chicago Tribune, Sterling Engraving, The Art Directors Club of New York, Hiram Walker, Abbott Laboratories and Time magazine. Of particular interest was his work for the Crowell Publishing Company which produced Colliers magazine. Also of interest in this period are the remarkable poster series for the United States government's Rural Electrification Administration."

Legacy and death 
His clear and concise use of typography was highly praised both in the United States and abroad. Throughout his career he used bold primary colors and illustrative arrows and lines in a graphic style that became easily recognizable as his own. He eventually moved to rural New York and set up an office, and home, at a premises that he and his family called "Dumbarton Farm". He remained at the farm until his death in 1969.

In May 2007, Swann Galleries in New York set an auction record price for Beall's 1939 photomontage poster promoting the Rural Electrification Administration's campaign to bring electricity to rural America. The image at right—considered one of the greatest American posters of all time—features a young boy and girl smiling and looking to the future as they lean against the wood fence bordering their farm. It sold for $38,400.

References

 Lester Beall: Space, Time & Content; RIT Graphic Design Chapbook Series 1, R. Roger Remington, 2003, RIT Cary Graphic Arts Press.

External links

 AIGA medalist biography
 Communication Arts biography
 Art Directors Club biography and images of work
 A Guide to Lester Beall, an online reproduction of an exhibition guide for the A-D Gallery, November 9–December 31, 1945.
 Running Water poster, in the collection of MoMA

1903 births
1969 deaths
AIGA medalists
American graphic designers
Federal Art Project artists